The Gamsspitzl is a mountain in the Stubai Alps of Austria. The peak has a height of 3052 m.

Facts
 Starting point: Sulzenau Hut  (2191 m)
 Height gain: 850 m
 Duration: 3 hours ascent, plus or minus depending on weather and experience

References

Mountains of Tyrol (state)
Mountains of the Alps
Stubai Alps